The men's 3000 metres steeplechase at the 1984 Summer Olympics in Los Angeles, California had an entry list of 35 competitors, with three qualifying heats (35 runners) and two semifinals (24) before the final (12) took place.

Summary
During the first lap of the race, a bandit rushed the track, joining the race over the first water jump.  He managed to sprint past security over the next barrier and beyond before being tackled.  On the second lap, he managed to get free again for a few moments before finally being dragged away.

Shortly after the second lap began, Peter Renner assumed the lead, followed by Kenyan Julius duo of Julius Korir and Julius Kariuki.  Henry Marsh was typically as much as 20 metres back off the pace.  Renner opened up several metres on the Kenyans but with two laps to go, the field began bunching behind Renner with Brian Diemer, Joseph Mahmoud, Colin Reitz and Marsh back in the fold, all getting ready to pounce.  Just before the bell, Renner started to fall back.  Korir accelerated and Marsh was the first to follow, Diemer was next to catch up, followed by Mahmoud.  Through the final turn, Marsh looked like the only one still with any shot at Korir, but he was still losing ground.  Marsh was unable to make any headway as Mahmoud passed in on the outside, with Korir taking the final barrier as a hurdler and sprinting to victory.  Mahmoud sprinted away to the silver medal while Diemer challenged Marsh on the outside.  Diemer got the edge on Marsh with 10 metres to go, with the beaten Marsh just striding the final few steps over the line.

Records
Prior to this competition, the existing world, and Olympic records were as follows.

Schedule
The men's 3000 metres steeplechase took place over three separate days.

All times are Pacific Daylight Time (UTC-7)

Results

Heats
Note: Top six in each heat (Q) and the next six fastest (q) advanced to the semi-finals.

Heat 1

Heat 2

Heat 3

Semi-finals
Note: Top five in each heat (Q) and the next two fastest (q) advanced to the final.

Semi-final 1

Semi-final 2

Final

References

External links
Event overview at Olympedia.org

Men's 3000 metres steeplechase
1984
Men's events at the 1984 Summer Olympics